{{Automatic taxobox
| taxon = Vitricythara
| image = Vitricythara metria 002.jpg
| image_caption = Shell of Vitricythara metria (museum specimen at MNHN, Paris)
| authority = Fargo, 1953
| synonyms_ref = 
| synonyms =
| type_species = 
| subdivision_ranks = Species
| subdivision = See text
| display_parents = 3
}}Vitricythara is a genus of sea snails, marine gastropod mollusks in the family Mangeliidae.

Species
 Vitricythara metria (Dall, 1903)
Species brought into synonymy
 Vitricythara elata (Dall, 1889): synonym of Platycythara elata (Dall, 1889)
 Vitricythara lavalleana (d'Orbigny, 1847): synonym of Cryoturris lavalleana'' (d'Orbigny, 1847)

References

 Fargo, William G. The Pliocene Turridae of Saint Petersburg, Florida. 1953.

External links
 
 Worldwide Mollusc Species Data Base: Mangeliidae
 Bouchet, P.; Kantor, Y. I.; Sysoev, A.; Puillandre, N. (2011). A new operational classification of the Conoidea (Gastropoda). Journal of Molluscan Studies. 77(3): 273-308

 
Gastropods described in 1953